Erica Beer (19 January 1925 – 27 December 2013) was a German film actress. She was born in Munich.

Selected filmography

 Captive Soul (1952)
 The Last Waltz (1953)
 Heartbroken on the Moselle (1953)
 They Were So Young (1954) - Elise LeFevre
 Die goldene Pest (1954) 
  (1955) - Viola
 Winter in the Woods (1956) - Simone
 Black Forest Melody (1956) - Harriet Morton
  (1956) - Lia Serrana, Schauspielerin
 My Father, the Actor (1956) - Olympia Renée
  (1957) - Barbara
 Kindermädchen für Papa gesucht (1957) - Monika Bärwald
 And Lead Us Not Into Temptation (1957) - Sekretärin
 My Ninety Nine Brides (1958) - Regina Hale
  (1959)
 Crime After School (1959) - Erna Kallies
 Arzt aus Leidenschaft (1959) - Margot, eine Barfrau
 Arzt ohne Gewissen (1959) - Sabine
 Abschied von den Wolken (1959) - Cecily Sims
 That's No Way to Land a Man (1959) - Vera Reinhardt
 The Crimson Circle (1960) - Mrs. Carlyle
  (1960) - Erika Wieland
  (1961) - Lady in Grey
  (1962, TV miniseries) - Kim Marshall
 The Counterfeit Traitor (1962) - Klara Holtz
  (1962) - Gerda Bruck, Ronalds Frau
 Don't Fumble, Darling (1970) Schauspielerin in Geiselgasteig
 Deep End (1970) - Baths cashier 
 King, Queen, Knave (1972) - Frieda
 Zwei himmlische Dickschädel (1974) - Fräulein Fabich

References

External links
 

1925 births
2013 deaths
German film actresses
Film people from Munich
20th-century German actresses